Hummer was a division of General Motors.

Hummer may also refer to:

Vehicles
 Humvee, a military vehicle
 Hummer H1, a civilian version of the Humvee
 Hummer H2, other vehicle of the Hummer brand
 Hummer H3, other vehicle of the Hummer brand
 Harley-Davidson Hummer, a motorcycle
 E-2 Hawkeye, an aircraft

Music
 The Hummer, a 2006 album by Devin Townsend
 "Hummer" (Foals song), a 2007 single
 Hummer, another name for the Corrugaphone
 A song by Smashing Pumpkins on the album Siamese Dream

Other meanings
 Hummer (surname)
 Hummingbird, a bird
 Hummer (cocktail), a boozy milkshake made with vodka
 Hummer (1997 video game), a 1990s Sega arcade video game
 Hummer (2009 video game), a 2009 Sega arcade game
 A person or thing that hums
 A slang term for fellatio

See also
 Hammer (disambiguation)